Crimesterdam is an Armenian rock band from Yerevan. They are known for their rock and roll and psychedelic sound influenced by many bands such as Oasis, Blur, The Beatles, etc. The band is currently on hiatus.

Overview

Formation
Crimesterdam was founded in Yerevan in July 2010 by vocalist Arthur Solakhyan and guitarists Sarkis Shirinian and George Hovhannisyan. They played several concerts at local clubs with support from former The North Avenues bassist Dave Geodakian (who joined Crimesterdam in November 2010) and other musicians. Guitarist Yura Khachatryan joins the band in March 2011. The final line-up of Crimesterdam formed in June 2011 when Vladimir Hovhannisyan from Scream of Silence joined the band.

First releases
In December 2010 Crimesterdam signed to Indie Libertines Records label. They released their debut single Yeah Pappa I'm Smoking under Indie Libertines Records on 14 December, and several weeks later, on 31 January 2011, their acoustic EP, Acoustic for Indie Libertines, came out. It consisted of three songs, two of which are also featured on Mary Wants To Marry EP.

The band released their debut EP Mary Wants To Marry on 28 April 2011. EP was recorded and mixed at Dave Geodakian's home studio.

Later that year, on 3 September, Crimesterdam released Your Russian Wife EP, which was preceded with eponymous video.

Debut album
In October 2011 Crimesterdam started working on their debut full-length album. Their only LP, "Obsolete Modern Retro" was released on 18 June 2012.

Discography

Albums
 Obsolete Modern Retro (18 June 2012)

EPs
 Mary Wants To Marry (28 April 2011)
 Your Russian Wife (3 September 2011)

Singles
 Underground Glory (26 March 2012)
 Friday (As It Starts) / It Is Not Dying (7 May 2012) 
 Bring It On (6 November 2012) 
 An English Breakfast (6 November 2012) 
Compilations and Other
 Acoustic For Indie Libertines (31 January 2011)
 OMR'' (22 July 2022)

References

External links
 

Armenian rock music groups
Musical groups established in 2010
Musical groups disestablished in 2014
2010 establishments in Armenia